Highway 16 is a provincial highway in the Canadian province of Saskatchewan. It is the Saskatchewan section of the Yellowhead Highway, and also the Trans-Canada Highway Yellowhead section. The main purpose of this highway is to connect Saskatchewan with Canadian cities such as Edmonton and Winnipeg. The highway runs from the Alberta boundary in Lloydminster (50th Avenue or Highway 17) to the Manitoba boundary near Marchwell. Major cities it passes through are Saskatoon, North Battleford in the central part of the province, Yorkton in the far east and Lloydminster to the far west.

Part of the highway is a divided four-lane limited-access road that runs from the Alberta-Saskatchewan border to just west of the village of Bradwell, with the remaining part to the Manitoba border being an undivided two-lane highway. The road also serves as part of the Circle Drive in Saskatoon.

The Yellowhead began as the Yellowhead Red River cart trail. When the province was surveyed, the road evolved from a dirt to gravel to all-weather road known as Provincial Highway 5 from the Alberta–Saskatchewan boundary to Saskatoon, and as Provincial Highway 14 from Saskatoon to the Manitoba–Saskatchewan boundary. In the late 1950s and 1960s, the highway was straightened and widened. On August 15, 1970 the Yellowhead was opened for the northern Trans-Canada route. The highway was completely designated for the entire route as Saskatchewan Highway 16 in 1976.

Route description

West

Survey markers were erected in Lloydminster to demark the Saskatchewan–Alberta boundary. Lloydminster is one of two Canadian cities on a provincial boundary and the gateway to Alberta. It currently ranks in size as the 89th largest city in Canada. The two sides of the city rank 10th in Alberta and 11th in Saskatchewan in municipal population. If the city were entirely in one province or the other, Lloydminster's population would rank ninth in Alberta and fifth in Saskatchewan. It is renowned for its booming petroleum industry and the OTS Heavy Oil Science Centre. The highway is surveyed north of the Battle River and south of the North Saskatchewan River. Marshall is the first town southeast of Lloydminster with 533 residents is also the hometown of NHL Goaltender, Braden Holtby. Lashburn, a town of 967 in 2011 maintains the Lashburn Municipal Campground.
Waseca is a village of 154 in 2011. Maidstone, a town of 1,156 in 2011 is home to the rural municipality office for Eldon No. 471 and the Maidstone Campground. In 1975, a canola (rapeseed) plant statue was built alongside the Yellowhead in the centre of the town of Maidstone.
Bresaylor Heritage Museum still preserves heritage of Paynton and Bresaylor on Main Street, Bresaylor.

The Battlefords are the next large centre along the Yellowhead comprising, Battleford is a town of 4,065 residents(2011) and, North Battleford, a city of 13,888 residents Travelers can rest at the Eiling Kramer Campground or The Battlefords Provincial Park. North Battleford has an equestrian statue of a Royal Canadian Mounted Police officer located at the junction of Highway 40 and the Yellowhead. It is here that the North Saskatchewan River is crossed via the Battlefords Bridges, a twinned (in 2002) set of two-lane bridges. The Yellowhead travels southeast, to the north of the North Saskatchewan River henceforth, and south of the Thickwood Hills. The next communities are Denholm, a village of 76 persons, Maymont, a village of 146 in 2011, and Fielding, a small unincorporated area of Mayfield No. 406 The Yellowhead still travels parallel with the North Saskatchewan River on the south side of the highway affording the traveler with spectacular river valley panoramic views. Radisson is a town of 505 in 2011 which also provides services and campground. Borden incorporated as a village in 1909 and still maintains village status with a population of 245 in 2011. Near here is a scenic viewpoint stop-off area. The new Borden Bridge provides twinned highway service across the North Saskatchewan River. The old Borden Bridge was a narrow, two-way traffic bridge enhanced with arches, which is still visible from the new bridge. Langham is a town of 1,290 residents northwest of Saskatoon. Saskatoon, a city of 222,189 in 2011, is the largest city of the province, serving interprovincial travellers with a bypass road named Circle Drive.

East

Clavet a village of 345 residents is the first settlement east of Saskatoon. Elstow a village of 89 residents, and Colonsay a town of 475 residents are the next settlements in the Allan Hills area of Saskatchewan. Viscount boasted 252 folk in 2011. Plunkett, a village, maintains its status with 75 residents on the last census. Guernsey is located at the boundary of the rural municipalities of Usborne and Wolverine No. 340 west of the Yellowhead at the Hwy 668 intersection. Lanigan is a town of 1,390 residents(2011). Dafoe maintains village status with its 15 residents in 2011. This village is south of Big Quill Lake, and north of the Touchwood Hills. Located at the CanAm highway intersection.

Wynyard a town of 1,767 residents on the 2011 census is located just east of the Hwy 640 intersection and is in the northern area of the Touchwood Hills.
The population of Elfros has dropped from about 300 residents in 1955 to 96 in 2011. It is located at the intersection of Hwy 35. Leslie Station, established in 1909, changed name to Leslie in 1962.

Foam Lake is south of the lake of the same name and west of the Hwy 310 intersection. Foam Lake incorporated as a village in 1909, and a town in 1924, and still maintains town status with a population of 1,148 residents in 2011.
The statue of a sharp-tailed grouse, Saskatchewan's provincial bird, was erected in 1985 at Sheho to commemorate both the 80th anniversary of the province of Saskatchewan as well as the incorporation of Sheho as a village. To the south of Foam Lake are the rolling Beaver Hills area. Sheho had a population near 300 in a district of about 1,500 in 1955, which although dropped to 121 in 2006, saw growth to 130 in 2011. This area of the rail and Yellowhead highway runs southwest of the Whitesand River in this area.

Insinger today is just a small hamlet within Insinger No. 275 Rural municipality. Next is Theodore a village of 345 residents. Next is Springside a town of 525 residents that is located at the intersection of the Yellowhead with Hwy 47 and Hwy 726 south of Good Spirit Lake. The Royal Canadian Air Force (RCAF) Station Yorkton was renamed White Spruce in 1966. Yorkton is a city of 15,669(2011) Yorkton is north of Roussay and Leech lakes at the junction of Hwy 52, Hwy 10, Saskota Travel Route, and the Yellowhead.

Clonmel is a hamlet within Saltcoats No. 213 Rural municipality. Stirling was the first naming of Saltcoats, which is now a town of 474. Bredenbury, a town of 364 (in 2011) is located at the Hwy 637 junction. Churchbridge is a town of 743 as of the 2011 census located at the Hwy 80 intersection. A large Canadian Dollar Coin was erected in 1993 at Churchbridge south of the Yellowhead to commemorate Rita Swanson, the artist resident of Churchbridge whose design was chosen to mark Canada's 125th birthday in 1992. Langenburg has grown to a town of 1,148 persons in 2011 and is situated on the Hwy 8 and Yellowhead intersection. Langenburg is home to the world's largest swing, named Goliath, and is the last incorporated Saskatchewan community before the Manitoba provincial boundary.

History

Red River Trail
Travel across Canada originated in the early 19th century when the Hudson's Bay Company and North West Company wanted to transport furs from the east to Fort St. James in the New Caledonia district, British Columbia. Sir George Simpson, governor of the Hudson's Bay Company, employed a surveyor, James Macmillan, to find a route west. James Macmillan used an Iroquois guide "Tête Jaune" (Pierre Bostonais) to help find the most feasible path. Leather was needed at Fort St. James for moccasins and mukluks. The path from Saskatchewan to British Columbia through the Rocky Mountains became known as the Leather Pass or Leather Track and more commonly the Yellowhead. Tête Jaune or Yellowhead was the moniker for Pierre Bostonais, which referred to his blonde hair. Pierre Bostonais, the founder of the Yellowhead trail, has also been recorded as Pierre Hatsinaton and his nickname Tête Jaune Cache.
The beginnings of this overland route can be found in the 19th century travel along the Carlton Trail, a Red River cart dirt trail which connected Fort Gary, Fort Ellice, Fort Carlton, Fort Battleford, and Fort Pitt through a northerly route. In 1876, Battleford became the capital of the North-West Territories. This area at the junction of the Battle River and the North Saskatchewan River was home to Cole's Post as early as 1780. A Hudson's Bay Company store and trading post, the North-West Mounted Police barracks and Government House were all established in 1876.

Immigration and settlements
The railways would not build across the western frontier without settlement as it would be too costly to provide train service across a barren wilderness. The Clifford Sifton immigration policy encourages settlers to arrive. Western settlement began and immigration encroached across the Manitoba boundary into the North-West Territories, later to become Saskatchewan. Immigration settlement to the last best west and the highway early beginnings began in the southeast. The federal government survey crew reached this southeastern area of the District of Assiniboia, North-West Territories in 1880. In 1881, the province of Manitoba expanded to its present boundaries. U.S. President Lincoln's Homestead Act was passed in 1862 and lands there were taken. In 1872, Canada passed the Dominion Lands Act, attracting homesteaders to the West with land available for homesteading that could be purchased for $10 for 160 acres.

With the establishment of settlements and population came the attendant need for education, health, fire and police protection and an urgent need to improve methods of travel. The North-West Territories established departments, which did not last long, and were soon replaced by a rural administrative system called local improvement districts (LID). Local improvement districts were very large, and with the early dirt trails for roads, and a limited number of automobiles, the area was found much too large to administer. The LID soon gave way to the rural municipality (RM) system of rural civic administration and encompassed on average nine townships, three by three in area, which were each  square, and with some modifications is still the rural administration in use today. This civic government with its elected officials attended to the maintenance and construction of the early pioneer road.

Provincial Highway 14
Provincial Highway 14, the precursor of the Yellowhead Saskatchewan Highway 16 followed the surveyed grade of the Manitoba and North West railway, later the CPR between the Manitoba boundary and Saskatoon.  Travel along the current Yellowhead before the 1940s would have been travelling on the square following the township road allowances, barbed wire fencing and rail lines. As the surveyed township roads were the easiest to travel, the first highway was designed on 90-degree, right-angle corners as the distance traversed the prairie along range roads and township roads.  Two-horse then eight-horse scrapers maintained these early dirt roads.

Up until 1904 all municipal affairs were administered by the Territorial Dept. of Public Works. In 1904, [Churchbridge]...became a portion of a larger area known as a Local Improvement District of approximately  square miles...Road construction costs around 1900, were very low.

The rail line was graded in 1907 and the Pleasant Hill branch connecting Sutherland to Viscount was operational in 1908. The Great West Express provided passenger service between Winnipeg and Saskatoon during the years 1909 to 1960. The Local Improvement District #17T2 was the first administrative government in the area starting in 1907 serving until the incorporation of Viscount No. 341 in 1909.

Elstow first formed in the area known as Lakeview. Administrative affairs were handled from 1905 to 1909 by the Local Improvement District #17-A3 and then by rural municipality Blucher No. 343. The station of Fountain was on the rail line and Provincial Highway 14 in 1907. Lanigan received steel in 1907. Lanigan was a CPR junction point and five rail lines served the area from Lanigan, as well as Provincial highway 14 (the Yellowhead) and Hwy 20. Humboldt and Watson were served to the north, and Nokomis to the south as well as the main Saskatoon Winnipeg line. The rail came to Wynyard in 1909, and three years later the area incorporated as a town. Wynyard was the CPR divisional point.
Laxdal received its post office in 1907, and renamed to Mozart in 1909.

Provincial Highway 5
 
 Provincial Highway 5, the Evergreen Route, the precursor of the Yellowhead Saskatchewan Highway 16 followed the surveyed grade of the Canadian Northern Railway, later the Canadian National Railway line between Saskatoon and the Alberta provincial boundary at Lloydminster. In 1903–1904 the Canadian Pacific Railway and the Grand Trunk Railway extended southeast from Saskatoon. One benefit from the grading of the two railways was that good construction roads paralleled the lines. Thus, the modern Yellowhead highway between Saskatoon and Lanigan owes its origins to the grading crews. The one event that had the greatest impact on the western segment of the Yellowhead was the decision of Donald Mann and William Mackenzie, owners of the Canadian Northern, to build from Manitoba to the Pacific.  

Whereas Dalmeny was a part of the historical Provincial Highway 5, it is not located directly upon the Yellowhead Highway (Saskatchewan Highway 16) presently. This survey crossed the North Saskatchewan River twice before reaching North Battleford. The stage coach route followed along to the south of the North Saskatchewan River, and the steel to the north of the North Saskatchewan River. The postal service was later given to the rails, and dissolved the use of the stage coach trail.

The ferry crossing was near the present Borden Bridge. This parkland area north of the river was termed the Baltimore district.
The first railway crossing was at Ceepee located on the southeast river bank of the North Saskatchewan River.

The first siding west of Saskatoon was Goodrich, which is more commonly known as Radisson today. There were two L.I.D.'s that formed the municipality. the northern one was L.I.D. 21-D-3 and the southern portion was L.I.D. 20-D-3 The local improvement districts administered the area between 1906 and the formation of Great Bend No. 405 in 1910. Local Improvement district No. 21-J-3 handled affairs between 1905 and 1910 when the local government was taken over by Mayfield No. 406 rural municipality.

July 28, 1905, Lloydminster was reached by the Canadian Northern Railway and November 24, 1905, Edmonton. The oil capital, Lloydminster was founded by the Barr colonists' settlement of 1903. Maymont saw its beginnings arise from a few Barr colonists who settled here en route to the Britannia settlement.
The rails arrived in the Battlefords in 1906. The Cutknife Highway Hwy Highway 674 to the south and the Paynton Ferry on the north crossing the North Saskatchewan River were both constructed in 1906–1907 creating the main intersection of Provincial Highway 5 (Yellowhead Highway) and Highway 674.

Automobile and road evolution
The car appeared in the early 20th century to be pulled by horse again in the dirty thirties. In 1906, cars could be registered, and plates were issued as early as 1912. In the late 1920s the roads were gravelled near the larger centers such as Yorkton, Saskatoon, the Battlefords, and Lloydminster. All-weather roads were developed in the 1930s, which began to depart from the surveyed township roads connecting centres directly. Roads also were constructed to allow for rain run-off, with a rounded top surface.

Lack of roads and excessive difficulties in building them throughout the district were major problems of the [Churchbridge] council as a resolution as passed and forwarded to the Provincial Government indicate. In a preamble to their resolution they point out that Good roads are the most important factor in forming a well to-do and contented population. and the Burden [sic] of building good roads would be too strenuous for the present generations. In Jan. 1910 records show us that L.I.D. No. 12 A-1 has become Local Improvement District No. 211.

On February 20, 1907, J.B. Gibson introduced the first car in Yorkton. It was a 20 horsepower Reo. Within the space of a few months, several other cars appeared on the streets of Yorkton, and the pattern spread to other towns along the line.

A chain-driven Case was the first gasoline power buggy driven in Paynton by Eddie Langier followed by Alex McKay's McLaughlin automobile. ...when this was a Local Improvement District ... men worked out the taxes by building up the road with pick and shovel and a team of horses and what we called a scraper. 

Norman Lambert of Denholm sold Ford Model T gas-powered buggies and the McLaughlin Buicks providing a 15- or 20-minute driving lesson to the proud new owner.
The roads were just prairie trails which wound around bluffs, up and down hills. These roads were quite adequate for horses, but were a different story for cars; very few of the roads went on the square where the roads allowances were finally surveyed. When it rained there was always a mud puddle at the bottom of every hill and every car that went through made the ruts deeper and deeper until you were stuck. The coming of cars soon made a big difference. The prairie trails proved inadequate and road allowances were graded and built up; culverts had to be installed where the natural water runs were. The new graded roads were a big improvement but many a muddy mile was driven over the country roads. Gradually, some of the main highways would get some gravel and it was quite a pleasure to pull of a muddy country road on to a few miles of gravel—Les Moffatt.

Mr. Hugh Gibson thought oxen were too slow—so he bought a motorcycle, then in 1912 he bought a Maxwell car, the first car in the area. [Maymont]

In the spring of 1912, debentures were sold to Wood and Gandy Co. for $17,700, so five new, steel road graders were purchased from Hamilton Machinery Co....World War II ended...Victory bonds were cashed and a Crawler tractor with a carry-all scraper was purchased. The first motor patrol operator was hired at $125 per month. Snow removal became necessary so a V-plow attachment and a set of chains were added...[1954-1956] Highway #14 had been reconstructed so the R.M. posted new signs for the towns at junctions..

Radisson became a town July 1, 1913, eight years following the arrival of the rail.
 On January 1, 1913, our [Churchbridge] district became part of the R.M. No. 211.  A by-law passed in 1913 limited speed to 10 m.p.h. [/hour ] for motor vehicles, amended in 1917 to 15 m.p.h. [/per hour ] and again in 1937 to 20 m.p.h. [/per hour ] Provincial licenses were required for cars in 1913 and the license number and make of car to be registered with the secretary-treasurer. A person had to be 18 years of age to drive a car. In 1917 motor vehicles were required to be operated in a manner not to frighten horses.

I.J. Carruthers operated Carruthers Garage in Lashburn, and six Model T Ford cars were shipped here October 5, 1917. These cars required assembly, and in total 18 cars were sold in 1917, and 24 in 1918 with prices ranging from $563 to $818. Lashburn was served by Provincial Highway 5, the early name for Saskatchewan Highway 16.

The Viscount RM arranged for surveys for the area's main roads in 1917.
The Canadian Pacific Railway came to Lloydminster in 1926. This plan was followed at that time. In 1930 a delegation from council addressed the Minister of Highways and the Cabinet at Regina requesting that #5 Highway be an all-weather highway across the Province. In other words gravel all the way. In 1947 several lots on the north of the town were sold to the Provincial Department of Highways for the construction of Highway #5 to by-pass the town on the north end.

The company that built the old highway (#5) that paralleled the Canadian National Railway...grading that road in 1928 or 1929 with their four horse teams.

The construction of Number 14 Highway between Lanigan and Saskatoon was started in 1929. The Provincial Number 14 was graveled in 1930. The 1930s saw the beginnings of gravel roads, and the surface from Wynyard to Manitoba was gravel, and the 1940s saw the entire eastern route graveled.

The Borden Bridge was constructed in 1936 replacing ferry service across the North Saskatchewan River. This northwestern route was gravelled by 1955. The Borden Bridge–Saskatoon cut off was officially opened on October 20, 1969, shortening the trip between North Battleford and Saskatoon by  As the highway was developed and the course straightened out, some towns disappeared as they were disconnected from the Yellowhead route. Dalmeny survived the Borden Bridge–Saskatoon straightening project.

Some highway construction ensued as a make work project of the thirties. A work and wages program provided assistance to farmers during the depression years of the Dirty Thirties. The municipality received improved roads under this program wherein many RM roads were gravelled.

In January 1943, rates for roadwork were set at 80 cents an hour for a man with a four-horse team, a single man received 40 cents an hour and a man with a two-horse team could receive 65 cents per hour. The foreman collected wages of 50 cents an hour for roadwork.

A larger improvement came about as a part of the industrial revolution in the 1940s following the return of the men from World War II. Following World War II improved economic and farming factors saw an increase of taxation, and mechanized road building programs resulting in better roads. The [Churchbridge] municipality had now acquired power road building and maintenance equipment. In 1958, the road construction equipment was traded for an Adams No. 440 motor grader and snow plow. Improved highways and travel by automobile soon saw the demise of a great majority of settlements along the prairie which were lively communities in the first half of the 20th century.  November 1947 saw communities along the Yellowhead organize together with caravans and meetings to encourage the Trans-Canada Trail to build on the northern route connecting eastern and western Canada. The Trans-Canada was officially opened in 1962 along the southern route.

The highway [near Sheho] is currently [1955] being re-rerouted and completely rebuilt. In 1955, the Battlefords were served by Highways 4, 5, and 40 as well as the CNR and CPR. Saskatchewan Highway 16, then Provincial Highway 5 was nicknamed the Evergreen Route. Fort Battleford is still a national historic site. In 1955 it was predicted that the Trans-Canada Yellowhead would soon be hard surfaced along the route.

As of 1955, Highway No. 5 is an excellent all-weather hard-top road running into Saskatoon and connecting with good roads to other centres.

Archaeology site
The original Kirilovka Doukhobor Village was discovered by the Saskatchewan Highways and Transportation when undertaking construction of new lanes for Provincial Hwy 5 northwest of Saskatoon, and west of Langham. Excavations commenced August 23, 1996. A 1944 aerial photograph was superimposed upon the Hwy 5 construction area showing house foundations.

Yellowhead Highway

The early Provincial Highway 14 in the east and Provincial Highway 5 to the west were built and driven on the square. In 1957, the Trans-Canada Highway opened, and soon after, the Yellowhead became eligible for federal funding. The opening ceremonies for the Yellowhead were held in 1962, and the highway was finished in 1965. Provincial highway 14 was widened in 1957. The route was straightened bypassing Plunkett and Viscount. The 1957 road specifications were a right of way of 150′ and a road surface of 38′. The centre 22′ of this road was oiled, leaving 8′ gravel shoulders on each side.

 In 1968 the road was once again rebuilt...the right of way was widened to 180′ and the road. Improvements were made on this northern route, and on August 15, 1970, the Yellowhead Route was officially opened.

 This road was fully paved....In 1978 when #14 became part of the Yellowhead Route the number was changed to 16.

The Yellowhead Regional Economic Development Authority (REDA) came into formation April 1998 to encourage economic development by towns, villages, rural municipalities along the Yellowhead Route. This was Saskatchewan's 25th REDA and it included the founding members of Langenburg, Churchbridge and Bredenbury, MacNutt, Langenburg No. 181 and Churchbridge No. 211.

Divided highway

Canada is one of the only industrialized countries without a federally funded highway system...Recent federal policy changes have meant that freight, which was moved by rail, is now being moved by road. This has placed enormous stress on our roads. A strong national roads system is essential to the transfer of goods and services across this country.Highways and Transportation Minister Judy Bradley  

A ribbon-cutting ceremony was held August 24, 2000 when  of the Yellowhead highway were twinned in the summer of 2000 between Lashburn and Marshall. East of Marshall, the highway connected to the already twinned section. Grading will begin to twin another  section of highway between Lashburn and Maidstone in 2000, with the paving of this section completed in 2001. Highways and Transportation Minister Maynard Sonntag commented that twinning on the Yellowhead Highway will help to save
lives, along with improving driver safety and comfort...We are on track to meeting our twinning commitment for the national highway system.Highways and Transportation Minister Maynard Sonntag The four-lane twinned highway between Saskatoon and North Battleford was officially opened December 8, 1997 by Highways and Transportation Minister Judy Bradley and Federal Transport Minister David Collenette. $42.4 million was spent on this twinning creating  of new highway, a new bridge over the north Saskatchewan River near Borden and a new railway underpass. - Government of Saskatchewan Construction of these improvements cost $42.4 million. The Strategic Highway Improvement Program (SHIP) was a program between the federal and provincial government to upgrade highways with a main focus over five years to twin this section of the Yellowhead. By 2012 the Yellowhead is to be twinned from Saskatoon to the Alberta boundary. $164 million has been allocated for the two national highways in Saskatchewan, to finish twinning the Trans-Canada Highway 1 and to twin the Yellowhead between North Battleford and Lloydminster by the Federal and provincial governments on March 5, 2003.

Major intersections

References

External links

Trans-Canada Yellowhead Highway Association
Yellowhead It—Travel Guide to help you plan your next trip along ...
Yellowhead Regional Economic Development Authority

!colspan=3|Yellowhead Highway
|-
|width="30%" style="text-align: center;"|Previous province:Alberta
|width="30%" style="text-align: center;"|Saskatchewan
|width="30%" style="text-align: center;"|Next province:Manitoba

016
Saskatchewan 016
016
Saskatchewan
Lloydminster
North Battleford
Streets in Saskatoon
Transport in Yorkton